Payyanat Ravindra Nathan better known by his pen name P. R. Nathan, is a novelist, screenplay writer, dramatist, short story writer, travelogue writer and speaker from Palakkad,  Kerala, India. He was awarded with the prestigious Kerala Sahitya Akademi Award for overall contribution in 2014. He has written over 55 books in various genres. He is the recipient of 41 major awards across various categories in literature. He is an expert in Naturopathy and Reiki . He has done over 7000 speeches around the world on Vedas, Upanishads and Tantra. His book Vaayikenda oru Pusthakam was selected for the Sri Padmanabha Swamy Bala Sahithya Award instituted by the Gramam Samskarika Vedi. He was born in Kizhayoor, a small village in Pattambi, Palakkad. He was born as the elder son of Prabhakara Menon, a drawing teacher and Sarojiniamma, a music teacher. He took graduation in telecommunication Engineering and was employed in Provident Fund organisation of India. He resigned from the office to concentrate on his literature works and travelling. He was a member of academy of music dance and drama and has been a member of many award juries.

His literature works was prescribed in many universities. He has written around hundred radio dramas also. His book Kanyakumari Muthal Himalayam Vare, so far his most famous work is written based on his travels to various parts of India. The book received huge critical acclaim.  He has been delivering daily lectures on moral science using anecdotes on Amrita TV  on the TV shows Dhanyamee Dinam on Udayamritham segment from 2004. This programme has been aired daily since Amrita TV's inception and it has been bestowed with multiple State TV Awards for excellence. In 2015 Media One TV an Indian television channel broadcasting in Malayalam operated by Madhyamam Broadcasting Limited started broadcasting a similar show. He has written 21 novels, over 500 shortstories, screenplays, dramas. He has received 41 awards in various fields of literature. His works implies the philosophical view of practical life. He is famous for his philosophical works which at the same time satisfies the rationalist thoughts. He had served as the president of Calicut Book Club. He is also the editor of Pradeepam magazine, which is being published from Kozhikode. He now resides at Kozhikode with wife Vijayalakshmi.

He received the Tagore Award in 1980 and the Gayathri Award in 1995.

Films
Chatta (1981)(story, screenplay)
Keli (1991) (dialogue)
Pookkalam Varavayi (1991) (story)
Dhwani (1988) (writer)
Shubhayathra (1990) (story)
Snehasindooram(1997)(Story)

Novels
Chaatta
Kaashi
Ottamaina
Karimarunnu
Innale Vanna Vazhi
Nananja Pakshi
Kooda
Ini Oru Moham Matram
Swapnangal Vilkunnu Kachavadakkaran
Shayanapradakshinam
Pavitrakettu
Kudajadrisaanukkaliloode
Soundaryalahari
Chandanakaavu
Monsoon
Pashchimaghattam
Maadambi
Dhwani
Pookkalam Varavayi
Scooter
Ishtadhaanam

Short stories
Kali Ganga
Koothupaavakal
Mahamaaya
Kannadikoodu
Anguleeyam
Gangaprasadinte kuthira
Alakananda
Ottakal Mookuthi
Prakaasikunna Kathakal
Nanmakal Cheyamaayirunnu
Etra Sundarajeevitham
Saranya

Philosophy
Vaayikenda oru Pusthakam
Dhanyamee Dhinam
Amrutha Kathakal
Gunappada Kathakal
Udayamritha Chinthakal
Sandesa Kathakal
Vijayamantra
Chirikkanoru Jeevitham
Kathaparayum Gurunathan
Odiyanum Manthravvadiyum
Elassum Thakidum thodukurishastravum
Jeevitha Vijaya Kathaamrutham
Darsaneeka kathakal

Travelogues
Kanyakumari Muthal Himalayam Vare
Himalaya Yatra

Dramas
Kalikaala Vaibhavam
Shanthivanam

Television
Scooter
Seemantham
Elathaalam
Gnanoodayam
Varshamayooram
Anandabhairavi
Shanthivanam
Onnam Classile Mashu
Angaadipaattu
Pakalveedu

Awards
 Kerala Sahitya Akademi Award for Overall Contributions
Kerala Sahitya Akademi Award
Delhi Sahitya Parishad Award
Vidyabhooshanam Award
Tagore Award
Pottekat Award
Padmanabhaswami Award
Kunchan Nambiar Award
Vivekananda Award
Aksharakalari Award
Nila Award
Gayathri Award
Thoolika Award
Thirakatha Award
Nana Award
M.T.V Award
Film City Award
Grihalakshmi Award
Kalakeralam Award
Television Vaignanika Paripadi Award
Roselin Award
Lions Club International Award
Ala award
Best Travelogue Award
Kashyapa Veda Award
Saraswathi Puraskar
Gandhigram Award
Chalachithra Sahrudaya Award
Kalanidhi Award
Bashir Award
Sanathana Dharma Parishath Award
Ofka Award
Dhaarmikatha Award
Sukumar Azhikode Award
Agnaka Award
Channel Prabhashanam Award
Valluvanad Sahitya Award
Mythri Forum Award
Jyothish Trust Award
Kshetra Jyothi Award
Thapasya Keerthi Award
Aananda Dhaamam Award
Kashyapa Veda Award

References

External links
Udayamritham
Award for P.R. Nathan

Living people
1946 births